Acacia aneura var. microcarpa is a perennial shrub or tree endemic to Australia, in the Northern Territory and Western Australia.

See also
 List of Acacia species

References

aneura var. microcarpa
microcarpa
Endemic flora of Australia
Flora of the Northern Territory
Fabales of Australia
Acacias of Western Australia
Trees of Australia
Taxa named by Leslie Pedley